The 2016 Food City 500 was a NASCAR Sprint Cup Series race that was held on April 17, 2016, at Bristol Motor Speedway in Bristol, Tennessee. Contested over 500 laps on the  concrete short track, it is the eighth race of the 2016 NASCAR Sprint Cup Series season, The race had 16 lead changes among different drivers and fifteen cautions for 102 laps.

Report

Background

Bristol Motor Speedway, formerly known as Bristol International Raceway and Bristol Raceway, is a NASCAR short track venue located in Bristol, Tennessee. Constructed in 1960, it held its first NASCAR race on July 30, 1961. Despite its short length, Bristol is among the most popular tracks on the NASCAR schedule because of its distinct features, which include extraordinarily steep banking, an all concrete surface, two pit roads, and stadium-like seating.

Entry list
The entry list for the Food City 500 was released on Monday, April 11 at 11:39 a.m. Eastern time. Forty cars are entered for the race.

First practice

Qualifying
He said afterwards that winning the pole was "just awesome. This place is really complicated and my guys did a good job making the car drive well on all different segments.” Matt Kenseth, who qualified second, said that he was "just a little off. These guys did a great job with our Dollar General Camry today. Obviously, all of the JGR cars were fast again so thanks to everyone who’s building these things and TRD (Toyota Racing Development) with the engines. In the first round we were pretty good we thought and then the second round we tried something and we were too tight and then the third round we were a little too loose really. We were just that much off, but overall it was a great day and we’ll still get a good pit stop and a good place to start and hopefully we’ll get it driving good tomorrow and we can race them on Sunday.” During round 1, Ty Dillon got loose exiting turn 3 and slammed into the back of Landon Cassill.

Qualifying results

Practice (post-qualifying)

Second practice

Final practice

Race

First half

Start

Under clear skies, Carl Edwards led the field to the green flag at 1:19 p.m. Dale Earnhardt Jr. made an unscheduled stop on the first lap after reporting he had no power. “Yeah, we got the Roush system on our cars for the stuck throttle issue, and just warming the brakes up I engaged that system to kill the throttle,” Earnhardt said. “I was warming the brakes up like I always do, and apparently I applied too much pressure and it killed the motor. If your throttle is stuck and you mash the brake, you’re going to mash the [expletive] out of that brake when the throttle sticks. It will shut the motor off.” He rejoined the race in 40th two laps down. It only took 25 laps for Edwards to run into lapped traffic. This allowed Joey Logano to pull up to him and make a run on him. He was unable to pass him on the bottom and fell back. Logano caught Edwards behind a lapped car and passed him for the lead on lap 39. Matt Kenseth passed Logano to take the lead on lap 45. The first caution of the race flew on lap 52 for a single-car wreck in turn 2. Rounding the turn, Kyle Busch suffered a right-front tire blowout and slammed the wall. Kenseth and Logano swapped the lead on pit road, but Kenseth exited with the lead. Jimmie Johnson and Brad Keselowski were tagged for speeding and David Ragan was tagged for crew over the wall too soon. All three restarted the race from the tail-end of the field.

The race restarted on lap 59. The second caution of the race flew on lap 70 for a single-car wreck on the backstretch. Exiting turn 2, Ricky Stenhouse Jr. got loose and spun out.

The race restarted on lap 78. Logano made an unscheduled stop for a vibration on lap 109. To add insult to injury, he was tagged for an uncontrolled tire and was forced to serve a pass-through penalty. The third caution of the race flew for a single-car spin in turn 2. Busch got turned by Chris Buescher. Kenseth and Edwards traded the lead on pit road, but Kenseth exited with the lead. Ragan was tagged for having too many men over the wall and restarted the race from the tail-end of the field.

Second quarter
The race restarted on lap 122. The fourth caution of the race flew on lap 147 for a single-car wreck involving Kyle Larson.

The race restarted on lap 155. The fifth caution of the race flew on lap 187 for a single-car wreck in turn 2 involving race leader Kenseth who suffered a tire blowout and slammed the wall. This handed the lead back to Edwards.

The race restarted on lap 195. The sixth caution of the race flew on lap 219 after Ragan lost an engine in turn 4. Greg Biffle and Austin Dillon were tagged for speeding and restarted the race from the tail-end of the field.

The race restarted on lap 227. The seventh caution of the race flew on lap 259 for a single-car wreck in turn 2. Rounding the turn, Busch slammed the wall for the third time. Landon Cassill opted not to pit and assumed the lead.

Second half

Halfway
The race restarted on lap 274. Edwards got under Cassill and retook the lead on lap 282. Johnson was running third when he made and unscheduled stop on lap 302. He rejoined the race in 31st two laps down. Kevin Harvick took the lead from Edwards on lap 320. The eighth caution of the race flew on lap 331 for a single-car wreck in turn 1 involving Josh Wise. Harvick swapped the lead with Edwards on pit road and Edwards exited in the lead.

The race restarted on lap 338. The ninth caution of the race flew for a single-car spin in turn 2. Entering turn 1, Casey Mears got tapped in the side by A. J. Allmendinger and sent him spinning.

The race restarted on lap 345. The tenth caution of the race flew on lap 349 for a single-car wreck in turn 2 involving Brian Scott.

The race restarted on lap 356. Kurt Busch cleared Edwards exiting turn 4 to take the lead on lap 357. Keselowski was running fourth when he made an unscheduled stop on lap 389. He rejoined the race in 27th two laps down. Edwards passed Busch in turn 2 to retake the lead on lap 399. The 11th caution of the race flew with 90 laps to go after Hamlin slammed the wall exiting turn 2. Larson was tagged for speeding and restarted the race from the tail-end of the field.

Fourth quarter
The race restarted with 84 laps to go. The 12th caution of the race flew with 63 laps to go for a single-car wreck in turn 4. Rounding turn 3, Martin Truex Jr. got into the side of Aric Almirola and sent him spinning into the wall.

The race restarted with 52 laps to go. The 13th caution of the race flew with 40 laps to go for a two-car wreck in turn 2 involving Cassill and Ty Dillon.

The race restarted with 34 laps to go. The 14th caution of the race flew with 15 laps to go for a single-car spin on the backstretch involving Michael Annett.

The race restarted with 10 laps to go. The 15th caution of the race flew with eight laps to go for a single-car spin on the backstretch involving Regan Smith.

The race restarted with five laps to go and Edwards drove on to score the victory.

Post-race

Driver comments
“There were so many different things happening out there,” Edwards said. “Different guys were fast at different times. I have to work on my drag racing stuff, Kurt (Busch) has those restarts figured out. He was tough. Just awesome. This is a real testament to my team. The guys have been working really hard. We’ve got Comcast Business folks here and they helped put this whole thing together with ARRIS and Toyota, TRD, Stanley – all the folks that made this 19 team happen. Just great and so awesome. Thanks to Sprint and Cessna and all the folks that make this happen. Now we’re in the Chase and we can go have some fun. Just so cool, awesome to be here.”

Race results

Race summary
 Lead changes: 16 
 Cautions/Laps: 15 for 102
 Red flags: 0
 Time of race: 3 hours, 15 minutes and 52 seconds
 Average speed:

Media

Television
Fox Sports covered their sixteenth race at the Bristol Motor Speedway. Mike Joy, five-time Bristol winner Jeff Gordon and 12-time Bristol winner – and all-time Bristol race winner – Darrell Waltrip will have the call in the booth for the race. Jamie Little, Chris Neville, Vince Welch and Matt Yocum will handle the pit road duties for the television side.

Radio
PRN had the radio call for the race which will also be simulcasted on Sirius XM NASCAR Radio. Doug Rice, Mark Garrow and Wendy Venturini will call the race in the booth when the field is racing down the frontstretch. Rob Albright called the race from atop the turn 3 suites when the field raced down the backstretch. Brad Gillie, Brett Mcmillan, Jim Noble, and Steve Richards covered the action on pit lane.

Standings after the race

Drivers' Championship standings

Manufacturers' Championship standings

Note: Only the first sixteen positions are included for the driver standings.. – Driver has clinched a Chase position.

References

External links

Food City 500
Food City 500
NASCAR races at Bristol Motor Speedway
Food City 500